Dizygocrinus, also known as the feather star, is a genus of extinct sea lily from the Batocrinidae family.

These stationary upper-level epifaunal suspension feeders lived in the Carboniferous period of United States, from 345.0 to 342.8 Ma.

Species
Dizygocrinus biturbinatus (Hall)
Dizygocrinus indianaensis (Lyon and Casseday)
Dizygocrinus caroli (Hall)
Dizygocrinus whitei (Wachsmuth and Springer)
Dizygocrinus originarius (Wachsmuth and Springer)
Dizygocrinus montgomeryensis (Worthen)
Dizygocrinus gorbyi (Miller)
Dizygocrinus venustus (Miller)
Dizygocrinus peculiaris (Miller and Gurley)
Dizygocrinus mutabilis (Wachsmuth and Springer)
Dizygocrinus cantonensis (Wachsmuth and Springer)

References

Monobathrida
Paleozoic echinoderms
Carboniferous crinoids
Prehistoric crinoid genera
Fossils of the United States